Van Buren Township is one of the twenty townships of Darke County, Ohio, United States. The 2010 census found 1,469 people in the township.

Geography
Located in the southern part of the county, it borders the following townships:
Adams Township - north
Franklin Township - east
Monroe Township - southeast corner
Twin Township - south
Butler Township - southwest corner
Neave Township - west
Greenville Township - northwest

No municipalities are located in Van Buren Township.

Name and history
Statewide, other Van Buren Townships are located in Hancock, Putnam, and Shelby counties.

Van Buren Township was created in June 1838 and reduced by the formation of Franklin Township in June of the following year.  It is probable that the township's first settlers arrived in 1818.  Over thirty years passed between the first settlement and the foundation of the first churches; the United Brethren and Methodist Episcopal churches were established in 1850.

Van Buren Township was named for Martin Van Buren, eighth President of the United States and President at the time of the township's creation.

Government
The township is governed by a three-member board of trustees, who are elected in November of odd-numbered years to a four-year term beginning on the following January 1. Two are elected in the year after the presidential election and one is elected in the year before it. There is also an elected township fiscal officer, who serves a four-year term beginning on April 1 of the year after the election, which is held in November of the year before the presidential election. Vacancies in the fiscal officership or on the board of trustees are filled by the remaining trustees.  The current trustees are Tim Warner, David Delk, and Jed Smith, and the fiscal officer in Kent Thompson.

References

External links
County website

Townships in Darke County, Ohio
Townships in Ohio